Henry Manus Curran (January 2, 1918 – March 13, 1993) was an American politician from New York.

Life
He was born on January 2, 1918, in Sewickley, Allegheny County, Pennsylvania. The family moved to Oyster Bay, Nassau County, New York, when Henry was still a child. He attended St. Dominic's Grammar and High School, and graduated from Pace College. He served in the U.S. Army during World War II, attaining the rank of captain, and served again in the Korean War. He engaged in the insurance business. He married Rita Rothmann (died 2009), and they had four children.

He entered politics as a Republican, was a deputy sheriff of Nassau County, and was Town Clerk of Oyster Bay from 1954 to 1960. He was a member of the New York State Senate from 1961 to 1968, sitting in the 173rd, 174th, 175th, 176th and 177th New York State Legislatures.

On January 27, 1969, he was appointed to the New York State Harness Racing Commission. He was Chairman of the Commission from 1973 to 1975.

He died on March 13, 1993, in North Shore University Hospital at Glen Cove, New York; and was buried at the Cemetery of the Holy Rood in Westbury.

Sources

External links
 The Henry M. Curran papers at the M. E. Grenander Department of Special Collections and Archives of the University at Albany, SUNY

1918 births
1993 deaths
People from Sewickley, Pennsylvania
Republican Party New York (state) state senators
United States Army officers
People from Oyster Bay (town), New York
Pace University alumni
20th-century American politicians
United States Army personnel of World War II
United States Army personnel of the Korean War
Military personnel from Pennsylvania
Burials at the Cemetery of the Holy Rood